The Datong–Zhangjiakou high-speed railway, also known as the Dazhang passenger dedicated line is a high-speed railway between Zhangjiakou in Hebei province in the east and Datong in Shanxi province in the west. There are five stations on the whole line. It is connected to the Beijing–Zhangjiakou intercity railway at Zhangjiakou station, and shares the tracks of the Huzhang Passenger Dedicated Line between Zhangjiakou station and Huai'an station. The Da Zhang Passenger Dedicated Line forks out at Huai'an Station and is connected to the Datong–Xi'an passenger railway at Datong South. It forms part of the Beijing–Zhangjiakou–Datong–Taiyuan branch of the Beijing–Kunming corridor.

History
The commissioning and testing of the line started on 13 September 2019, and it started operations on 30 December 2019.

References 

High-speed railway lines in China
Rail transport in Shanxi
Rail transport in Hebei
Railway lines opened in 2019
25 kV AC railway electrification